The 1953 Boston Red Sox season was the 53rd season in the franchise's Major League Baseball history. The Red Sox finished fourth in the American League (AL) with a record of 84 wins and 69 losses, 16 games behind the New York Yankees, who went on to win the 1953 World Series.

Offseason 
 February 9, 1953: Vern Stephens was traded by the Red Sox to the Chicago White Sox for Marv Grissom, Hal Brown and Bill Kennedy.

Regular season 
 June 18, 1953: Sammy White scored three runs in one inning for the Red Sox. The Red Sox defeated the Detroit Tigers, 23–3 at Fenway Park.

Season standings

Record vs. opponents

Opening Day lineup

Notable transactions 
 July 1, 1953: Marv Grissom was selected off waivers from the Red Sox by the New York Giants.

Roster

Player stats

Batting

Starters by position 
Note: Pos = Position; G = Games played; AB = At bats; H = Hits; Avg. = Batting average; HR = Home runs; RBI = Runs batted in

Other batters 
Note: G = Games played; AB = At bats; H = Hits; Avg. = Batting average; HR = Home runs; RBI = Runs batted in

Pitching

Starting pitchers 
Note: G = Games pitched; IP = Innings pitched; W = Wins; L = Losses; ERA = Earned run average; SO = Strikeouts

Other pitchers 
Note: G = Games pitched; IP = Innings pitched; W = Wins; L = Losses; ERA = Earned run average; SO = Strikeouts

Relief pitchers 
Note: G = Games pitched; W = Wins; L = Losses; SV = Saves; ERA = Earned run average; SO = Strikeouts

Farm system 

LEAGUE CHAMPIONS: San Jose

Roanoke club folded, July 24, 1953

References

External links

1953 Boston Red Sox team at Baseball-Reference
1953 Boston Red Sox season at baseball-almanac.com

Boston Red Sox seasons
Boston Red Sox
Boston Red Sox
1950s in Boston